The Reform State or Reformist State is a period in Costa Rican history characterized by the change in political and economic paradigm switching from the uncontrolled capitalism and laissez faire of the Liberal State into a more economically progressive Welfare State. The period ranges from approximately 1940 starting with the presidency of social reformer Rafael Angel Calderón Guardia and ends around the 1980s with the first neoliberal and Washington Consensus reforms that began after the government of Luis Alberto Monge.

The Liberal State crisis

Between 1870 and 1940 the Liberals were the predominant political faction of the country promoting a State based on the capitalist economy, philosophical positivism and rationalist secularism especially in education and science. However, this deeply rooted Laissez faire policies begin to turn unsustainable due to a series of incidental internal and external situations, as; the economic crisis caused by the First World War, the increase in poverty and inequality, as well as the harsh working conditions, especially in the banana plantations of the United Fruit Company, the entry into the country of ethnic groups such as Chinese, Afro-Caribbeans and Italians to work on large urbanization projects such as the Atlantic Railroad (and which in the case of the Italians staged the first strike in the history of the country due to the fact that they came from Europe, where the workers and socialist movements were known) and the emergence in general of political-social movements that questioned the model including social-Christians, socialists, communists and anarchists.

In 1914 the liberal Alfredo González Flores of the Republican Party came to power but without going through the polls. González was appointed by Congress due to no candidate in the election having reach enough votes as established by the Constitution.  Therefore, Gonzalez lacked the necessary popular support for many of his reforms. González may have foreseen the need for reform and the exhaustion of the liberal model and initiated a series of interventionist reforms that included: creating direct taxes for land and income, creating the first state bank; the International Bank of Costa Rica, implementing the "Tercerillas" (the keeping of a third of the public employees' salary in the form of a loan to generate income to the state) and tax the Grand Capital. Most of these reforms, especially the tax reform, were adversely affected by the oligarchy. Rumors spread of electoral fraud in the Costa Rican legislative elections of 1915 and of Gonzalez seeking to establish an authoritarian regime and re-elect himself in 1918 (consecutive re-election was banned), all of which led to a coup instigated by the Secretary of War Federico Tinoco in 1917 who, in principle, enjoyed popular support. But Tinoco's authoritarian measures and the chaotic economic situation soon led to the emergence of strong opposition. The tinoquista dictatorship would last only two years and would be overthrown and exiled in 1919, restoring the constitutional order with Julio Acosta.

During this period the priest Jorge Volio Jiménez, influenced by the Catholic social teaching and Christian humanism, makes his appearance. Volio founded the first party of leftist ideas in Costa Rica, the Reformist Party, that was third of three in the presidential election of Costa Rica in 1923 with Volio as a candidate. Thanks to a series of negotiations with the most voted candidate, the republican Ricardo Jiménez Oreamuno as (again) no candidate reached the minimum required, Volio obtained the vice presidency and two ministries for his party along with the support to several projects. The republican-reformist alliance faced the candidate Alberto Echandi Montero of the Agricultural Party, which both caucuses opposed as they considered him too right-wing.

In 1933 there was the Great Banana Strike in the southern zone. At this time the working conditions were deplorable and the working population, influenced by intellectuals and politicians such as Manuel Mora Valverde, Maria Isabel Carvajal and Carlos Luis Fallas who founded the Workers, Peasants and Intellectuals Bloc (future Costa Rican Communist Party), begins a massive strike against the United Fruit Company of about 10,000 workers. The strike was demanding such rights as wage increases, payment in cash and not with coupons, first aid kits on the farms and eight-hour day. In 1943, two of the first unions were created, the Communist Central of Workers of Costa Rica and the Christian socialist Confederation of Workers Rerum Novarum.

Calderón's Presidency

Rafael Ángel Calderón Guardia, a medical doctor educated in Belgium where he came into contact with the social-Christian and humanist political movements, became president after the 1940 election as nominee in the Republican ticket. Although originally supported by his political godfather León Cortés Castro (president from 1936 to 1940 and known for his fascist and nazi sympathies), Calderón soon broke with Cortes' powerful oligarchy and initiated a series of economic and social reforms. 

The oligarchy, unhappy with these measures, planned a coup d'état against Calderón. Businessman Jorge Hine and one of the plotters tries to enlist the communists by contacting his leader and deputy Manuel Mora Valverde, but Mora declines and warns Calderón, so the coup is frustrated. Calderón, eager for allies, reaches an agreement with the Costa Rican Communist Party of Mora and the Catholic Church led by Monsignor Víctor Manuel Sanabria Martínez that would allow him to have enough political weight and combined popular support to promulgate the so call "Social Guarantees". The communists change their name to Popular Vanguard Party in order to appease the Church, and Calderon also takes back some of the secularizing measures taken by the Liberals like the prohibition of religious education and the ban on Catholic priests to be school principals.

Some of the reforms achieved in this era are; the foundation of the Costa Rican Social Security Fund, the creation of the University of Costa Rica (based on the Normal School and the University of Santo Tomás) and the drafting and approval of the Labor Code that created pioneering labor legislation. Tensions among conservative groups upset with these reforms, as well as accusations of corruption and electoral fraud, and the persecution of ethnic groups such as Germans, Italians and Japanese during World War II, it swelled the ranks of the opposition which led to the outbreak of the War of 48.

48 Revolution and Figueres Presidency

After the war, the victorious factions lead by Otilio Ulate and José Figueres took over. Communists and Republicans were outlawed and their leaders escaped into exile (this in betrayal of both the Ochomogo Pact with the communists and the Mexican Embassy Pact with the calderonistas). According to Figueres he was approach by representatives of the Oligarchy urging him to remain in power with their support and that of the press, but he rejected the proposal and informed Ulate. Figueres and his closest advisors took the power de facto in the form of a Junta for 18 months before passing the presidency to Ulate. But, despite Figueres revolt against Calderón and Mora, in fact he agreed with many of their social reforms as he was himself a self-proclaim Utopian socialist. Figueres and his Junta ruled by decree and made a series of progressive reforms that included; abolition of racial segregation (until 1949 Blacks and Asians couldn't travel outside of certain areas, mostly the Limón Province and couldn't vote), the creation of the Costa Rican Institute of Electricity, female suffrage is established in the Constitution and, most notably, the abolition of the Army. The attempt of a coup by Public Safety Minister Edgar Cardona known as "Cardonazo" was, in part, due to disagreement with this decision.

Welfare State and Carazo's crisis

To this point and since the 40s Costa Rica was essentially a Welfare State, with large public monopolies and many national institutions, a Keynesian guided economy and state capitalism which gained the nickname of "entrepreneur state". This allowed the country to enjoy of one of the biggest middle classes in Latin America alongside Chile, Uruguay and Argentina, good levels in health and literacy rankings and urban development. However, other problems started to emerge including an increasing fiscal deficit, a gigantic state payroll and an unsustainable statist economy which started to fracture the Reform State. 

Left-leaning President Rodrigo Carazo was elected for the 1978-1982 period. Carazo, who held left nationalist ideas, broke away from Washington, the World Bank and the IMF, rejecting the debt payment and the Washington Consensus and supported the FSLN actions against the Somoza dictatorship in neighboring Nicaragua causing increasing tensions and the threat of a Somocista invasion, alongside the 1979 oil crisis. All these circumstances resulted in shortages, unemployment and a grave economic crisis. Carazo's government will be followed by Luis Alberto Monge's after his landslide victory in the 1982 Costa Rican general election. Monge reversed Carazo's policies and instead re-established relations with the World Band and IMF, make the US relations back to normal supporting its policies to Sandinista Nicaragua and allowing the Contra operations in the Nicaraguan border. 

Most governments that followed Monge's implemented neoliberal measures: Oscar Arias Sánchez (1986-1990), Rafael Ángel Calderón Fournier (1990-1994), José María Figueres Olsen (1994-1998), Miguel Ángel Rodríguez Echeverría (1998-2002), Abel Pacheco (2002-2006), Oscar Arias Sánchez (2006-2010) and Laura Chinchilla Miranda (2010-2014). Besides, after the fusion of Carazo's alliance, the Unity Coalition, into the Social Christian Unity Party in 1983 Costa Rica would experience a quintessential two-party system whose most iconic representation was the so-called Figueres-Calderón Pact (an agreement between then president Figueres Olsen and former president Calderón Fournier in 1994) that enacted many unpopular neoliberal policies thanks to the combined vote of the PLN and PUSC caucuses in Parliament. Thus, the Reform State as such ends, passing to the neoliberal two-party system between 1982 and 2014 which ended with the election of progressive candidate from a third party Luis Guillermo Solís of the Citizens' Action Party in the 2014 Costa Rican general election.

References

History of Costa Rica
Politics of Costa Rica
19th century in Costa Rica